Howell High School is a coed public secondary school in Howell, Michigan, United States. The school serves grades 9-12 for the Howell Public School District.

Academics 
HHS is ranked among the top 6,750 public high schools in America, 277th in Michigan, and 77th in the Detroit Metro Area. 34% of students participate in Advanced Placement courses, with 23% of students passing at least one AP exam. Accord to state testing, proficiency in Mathematics is 37%, and Reading 64%. The graduation rate is 91%.

Demographics

The demographic breakdown of the 2,200 students enrolled for 2018-19 was:
Male - 50.4%
Female - 49.6%
Native American/Alaskan - 0.6%
Asian - 1.2%
Black - 0.6%
Hispanic - 3.9%
Native Hawaiian/Pacific islanders - 0.3%
White - 92%
Multiracial - 1.7%
17.8% of the students were eligible for free or reduced-cost lunch.

Athletics
Howell High School's Highlanders compete in the Kensington Lakes Activity Association. School colors are green and Vegas gold. The following Michigan High School Athletic Association (MHSAA) sanctioned sports are offered:

Baseball (boys) 
Basketball (girls and boys) 
Bowling (girls and boys) 
Competitive cheerleading (girls) 
Cross country (girls and boys) 
Boys state champion - 1959, 1960
Football (boys)
Golf (girls and boys) 
Gymnastics (girls) 
Ice hockey (boys) 
Lacrosse (boys)
Skiing (girls and boys) 
Soccer (girls and boys)
Softball (girls) 
Swim and dive (girls and boys) 
Tennis (girls and boys) 
Track and field (girls and boys) 
Volleyball (girls) 
Wrestling (boys)

Notable alumni
 Mark Schauer - United States House of Representatives, Michigan's 7th congressional district 2009-2011
Elmo Kennedy O'Connor - rapper
Shirley Weis - Mayo Clinic Chief Administrative Officer 2007-2013

References

External links

School district website

Public high schools in Michigan
Schools in Livingston County, Michigan
Educational institutions established in 1925
1925 establishments in Michigan
School buildings completed in 1981
1980s architecture in the United States